Alison Krauss & Union Station is an American bluegrass and country band associated with singer Alison Krauss. It was initially composed of Krauss, Jeff White, Mike Harman and John Pennell. Later additions included Tim Stafford, Ron Block, Adam Steffey, Barry Bales and Larry Atamanuik. In 1992, Stafford was replaced by guitar and mandolin player Dan Tyminski and in 1998, Steffey left and was replaced by Dobro player Jerry Douglas.

Career
Alison Krauss had signed to Rounder Records, and at age 16 released her 1987 debut album Too Late to Cry. Soon after she joined Union Station, with Jeff White, John Pennell, and Mike Harman as her backing band. Their debut album in 1989 was Two Highways. The album included the traditional tunes "Wild Bill Jones" and "Beaumont Rag", along with a bluegrass interpretation of The Allman Brothers' "Midnight Rider".

Krauss' contract with Rounder Records required her to alternate between releasing a solo album and an album with Union Station. So after yet another solo album I've Got That Old Feeling in 1990, Krauss' second Union Station album was Every Time You Say Goodbye released in 1992. The album went on to win her second Grammy for Best Bluegrass Album of the year. This album featured a completely different lineup (other than Krauss): Tim Stafford, Ron Block, Adam Steffey, and Barry Bales. Bales and Block would become permanent fixtures in the band.

Tim Stafford left the band in 1992, and was replaced by mandolin and guitar player Dan Tyminski from Lonesome River Band. During 1993, Tyminski briefly rejoined Lonesome River Band and was then replaced by John R. Bowman who toured with Union Station until 1994, when Tyminski returned as a permanent member.

So Long So Wrong, another Union Station album, was released in 1997 and won the Grammy Award for Best Bluegrass Album. One critic said its sound was "rather untraditional" and "likely [to] change quite a few ... minds about bluegrass". Included on the album is the track "It Doesn't Matter", which was featured in the second season premiere episode of Buffy the Vampire Slayer and was included on the Buffy soundtrack in 1999.

Adam Steffey left Union Station in 1998, and was replaced by renowned Dobro player Jerry Douglas.

Their next album, New Favorite, was released on August 14, 2001. The album went on to win the Grammy for Best Bluegrass Album, with the single "The Lucky One" winning a Grammy as well. Lonely Runs Both Ways was released in 2004, and eventually became another Alison Krauss & Union Station gold certified album. Ron Block described Lonely Runs Both Ways as "pretty much... what we've always done" in terms of song selection and the style, in which those songs were recorded. Krauss believes the group "was probably the most unprepared we've ever been" for the album and that songs were chosen as needed rather than planned beforehand.

Returning with Union Station, Alison Krauss released a new album called Paper Airplane on April 12, 2011, the follow-up album to Lonely Runs Both Ways (2004). Mike Shipley (the engineering mixer) said that it took a lot of time to do the album because of Krauss' non-stop migraines.

In 2014, she and her band Union Station toured with Willie Nelson and Family, with special guests Kacey Musgraves, and The Devil Makes Three.

Members

Current members
Alison Krauss - lead vocals, piano, fiddle (1987–present)
Larry Atamanuik - drums, percussion (1987–present)
Ron Block - guitar, banjo (1991–present)
Barry Bales - bass (1990–present)
Dan Tyminski - vocals, guitar, mandolin (1992–1993, 1994–present)
Jerry Douglas - dobro (1998–present)

Former members
Dave Denman - vocals, guitar (1987–1992)
Mike Harman - banjo, vocals (1987–1992)
John R. Bowman - guitar (1993–1994)
Alison Brown - guitar, banjo (1987–1991)
Viktor Krauss - bass (1989–1990)
John Pennell - bass (1987–1989)
Tim Stafford - guitar, mandolin (1990–1992)
Adam Steffey - mandolin (1990–1998)
Jeff White - guitar, vocals (1987–1990)

Discography

Studio albums
Two Highways (1989)
Every Time You Say Goodbye (1992)
So Long So Wrong (1997)
New Favorite (2001)
Lonely Runs Both Ways (2004)
Paper Airplane (2011)

References

American bluegrass music groups
American country music groups
Musical backing groups
Country music groups from Tennessee
Musical groups established in 1987